The Illawarra Open was a professional golf tournament played in the Illawarra area of New South Wales, Australia. It was played between 1978 and 1981. 1978 and 1979 events had prize money of A$20,000. The 1981 event was played over 36 holes with reduced prize money of A$10,000 and was not a PGA Tour of Australia Order of Merit event. The 1982 event had prize money of A$25,000.

The 1978 tournament was planned as a 72-hole event. 18 holes were played on the Thursday and Friday but heavy rain at the weekend caused the tournament to be reduced to 36 holes.

Winners

References 

Golf tournaments in Australia
Golf in New South Wales
Sport in Wollongong